Kristin Umland is an American mathematician and mathematics educator.  She was on the faculty of the Department of Mathematics & Statistics at University of New Mexico in Albuquerque, New Mexico  for nearly two decades before leaving to help build the nonprofit organization Illustrative Mathematics (IM).

Education and career
Umland did undergraduate studies at the University of California at Santa Cruz in Santa Cruz, California. In 1996, she was awarded a Ph.D. in mathematics by the University of Illinois at Chicago. Her dissertation, entitled "The Mod-2 Cohomology of the Lyons Group", was supervised by Stephen D. Smith

In 1996, Umland began teaching in the Department of Mathematics & Statistics at the University of New Mexico (UNM).  She joined the tenure stream faculty in 2002 and was later promoted to associate professor. At New Mexico, Umland taught a wide variety of mathematics courses, ranging from intermediate algebra to measure theory, as well as courses in mathematics education.  She supervised 3 doctoral dissertations and several master's dissertations. After being invited to visit the Vermont Mathematics Initiative by Dr. Ken Gross, Umland was set out to improve K–12 teaching and learning.

At UNM, Umland built on her Vermont Mathematics Initiative experience to improve children's learning and achievement. She was program director of La Meta, which was a partnership between the university, Central New Mexico Community College and five New Mexico public school districts.  After initially offering mid-grade teachers of mathematics a chance to earn mathematics credit, beginning in 2007, mathematics educators, mathematicians, mentors, and content coaches from the partnership visiting mid-grade classrooms.

Umland worked on an National Science Foundation-funded project to evaluate the impact of Math Teachers' Circles on teachers of middle school mathematics. The circles bring together mathematicians and K–12 mathematics teachers. She and her collaborators reported on the effectiveness of these circles, as well as their history, in the Notices of the American Mathematical Society.

Umland left UNM in 2016 to work full time as vice president for content development at Illustrative Mathematics (IM), a nonprofit company she co-founded with William McCallum to develop and deliver mathematics content for K-12 teachers. She became chief product officer in July 2019.  In June of 2020, Umland was appointed as president of IM.

Recognition
In 2017, the American Mathematical Society (AMS) recognized Umland with the AMS Award for Impact on the Teaching and Learning of Mathematics. The AMS cited Umland's work to support the "national K–12 mathematics community in the transition to the Common Core State Standards in Mathematics (CCSS-M)".   Umland and IM co-founder William McCallum, together with a community of mathematicians, mathematics educators and teachers developed an open, online resource to assist teachers learn about the core standards and their progression. The award citation reports that "since 2012, illustrativemathematics.org has had over four million visitors viewing tasks over fourteen million times".

In 2018, the Association for Women in Mathematics (AWM) honored Umland with Louise Hay Award  "in recognition of her leadership and contributions advancing large-scale improvement in mathematics education". The Louise Hay Awards for Contributions to Mathematics Education were initiated by the AWM in 1991.

Selected publications

References

External links
 Illustrative Mathematics

Living people
University of Illinois Chicago alumni
University of California, Santa Cruz alumni
American women mathematicians
20th-century women mathematicians
21st-century women mathematicians
20th-century American mathematicians
21st-century American mathematicians
Mathematics educators
Year of birth missing (living people)
20th-century American women
21st-century American women